The 2020–21 ASUN Conference men's basketball season began with practices in October 2020, followed by the start of the 2020–21 NCAA Division I men's basketball season in November. Conference play began in January 2021 and concluded in March 2021. It was the 43rd season of ASUN Conference basketball. This season was also the first ASUN season for Bellarmine, which started a transition from NCAA Division II when it joined the ASUN on July 1, 2020.

Preseason awards
Preseason awards were announced by the league office on November 5, 2020.

Preseason men's basketball coaches poll
(First place votes in parenthesis)
 Lipscomb (5) 74
 Liberty (2) 66
 Stetson (1) 64
 North Florida (1) 56
 FGCU 45
 North Alabama 40
 Jacksonville 29
 Bellarmine 18
 Kennesaw State 13

Preseason men's basketball media poll
(First place votes in parenthesis)
 Lipscomb (16) 256
 Liberty (10) 245
 Stetson (4) 202
 North Florida (2) 192
 FGCU 156
 North Alabama 146
 Jacksonville 108
 Kennesaw State 68
 Bellarmine 62

Honors
 Preseason Player of the Year: Ahsan Asadullah, Lipscomb
 Preseason Defensive Player of the Year: Elijah Cuffee, Liberty
 Fan-Voted Preseason Player of the Year: Caleb Catto, FGCU
 Fan-Voted Preseason Defensive Player of the Year: Alex Peterson, Kennesaw State

Conference matrix

All-ASUN awards

ASUN weekly awards

End-of-season awards
Source

References